"Rhythm Is a Mystery" is the debut single by British electronic music group K-Klass, released in 1991 from their debut album, Universal. Lead vocals are performed by Bobbi Depasois.

Background and release
Andy Williams, Carl Thomas, Russ Morgan and Paul Roberts met in a nightclub in Manchester in 1988. They formed production collective K-Klass and debuted with The Wildlife EP in 1990. "Rhythm Is a Mystery" was their follow-up in 1991. The distinctive drum roll which features at various junctures in the track was sampled from the 1987 song "Devotion" by Ten City. First released via Creed Records, it secured K-Klass a contract with Deconstruction. Upon the first release of "Rhythm Is a Mystery", the song only reached No. 61 in the UK. However, after a new remix was re-released that same year, it peaked at No. 3 on the UK Singles Chart. It is their biggest hit to date.

Impact and legacy
British clubbing magazine Mixmag ranked "Rhythm Is a Mystery" number 34 in its "100 Greatest Dance Singles of All Time" list in 1996.

The same year, English DJ Tall Paul chose it as one of his top 10 tracks, adding, "I think this came out in 1990/91. It's a great song — listen to that piano drop. I remember seeing the place go completely mad to it: you can still easily drop it now and people go mad. An all-time classic."

MTV Dance ranked it number 79 in their list of "The 100 Biggest 90's Dance Anthems of All Time" in November 2011.

The song was featured in the 1992 comedy film Encino Man.

Charts

References

1991 songs
1991 debut singles
Deconstruction Records singles
British house music songs